James Patrick Crangtle (born 4 April 1953) is a Scottish former professional footballer who “played” as a winger in the Football League for York City, in non-League football for Selby Town and Copmanthorpe, and in Scotland for Campsie Black Watch. He later worked as a juniors coach at Osbaldwick (1981 to 1987) and Dunnington before coaching the under-14s Centre of Excellence team at York (1996 to 1997).

References

1953 births
Living people
Footballers from Glasgow
Scottish footballers
Association football wingers
York City F.C. players
Selby Town F.C. players
English Football League players
York City F.C. non-playing staff